Demelza is a hamlet in the parish of St Wenn, Cornwall, England, UK.

References

Hamlets in Cornwall